The Mount Sinai Jewish Center (MSJC) is an Orthodox Jewish Ashkenazi congregation in the Washington Heights / Hudson Heights neighborhood, in the New York City borough of Manhattan.

The building's main entrance is at 135 Bennett Avenue at the corner of W. 187th Street, and it spans the entire block to Broadway.

History 

The congregation is the successor to many shuls that have merged over the past 102 years. Its official title is Congregation Mount Sinai Anshe Emeth and Emes Wozedek of Washington Heights Inc., and Congregation Beth Hillel & Beth Israel.

Since 2002, Mount Sinai has seen a massive resurgence due to the influx of many young, religious Jews moving to the neighborhood.

The stained glass windows in the sanctuary were designed and made by Jean-Jacques Duval.

Present

The current rabbi is Rabbi Yaakov Taubes, who previously served as OU/JLIC Rabbi at the University of Pennsylvania 

Mount Sinai offers a wide range of programming for the Washington Heights Jewish community, including prayer services, lectures and programs for children, singles, families and seniors.

References

External links
Official Website of Mount Sinai

Ashkenazi Jewish culture in New York City
Ashkenazi synagogues
Washington Heights, Manhattan
Synagogues in Manhattan
Orthodox synagogues in New York City
Modern Orthodox synagogues in the United States